Kronprinzenkoog is a municipality in the district of Dithmarschen, in Schleswig-Holstein, Germany.

Between 1785 and 1787, the polder was laid out and then named in honour of Crown Prince Frederick of Denmark.

References

Municipalities in Schleswig-Holstein
Dithmarschen
Koogs